Timna, Timnah or Timnath may refer to:

Places called Timna, Timnah, or Timnath
Timna Valley in Israel
Timna, a place in Yemen
Timnah, Philistine city mentioned in the Bible in the Book of Judges
Timnath-serah (also called Thamna), a historical place in Samaria
Timnath, Colorado, a town in the United States

Sites associated or identified with ancient places called Timna, Timnah, or Timnath
Khirbet Tibnah on SWP map 14, misidentified with biblical Timnah
Khirbet et-Tibbaneh, on SWP map 17; different from Timnah from SWP map 16

Other uses
Intel Timna, a CPU planned, but not manufactured by Intel